The Jordanian Arab Party is a Jordanian political party. The party was founded in 2002. The general secretary of the party is Mazin Riyal.

See also
 List of political parties in Jordan

References

Arab nationalism in Jordan
Arab nationalist political parties
Political parties established in 2002
Political parties in Jordan
2002 establishments in Jordan
Liberalism in the Arab world